Zsolt Bognár may refer to 

 Zsolt Bognár (footballer) (born 1979), Hungarian football player
 Zsolt Bognár (pianist) (born 1982), American classical pianist